The Gyroporaceae are a family of fungi in the order Boletales. The family is monogeneric, containing the single genus Gyroporus, which, according to a 2008 estimate, contains ten widely distributed species, though a more recent study inferred the species-level diversity to be far higher.

References

Boletales
Boletales genera